Lincoln Township is a township in Coffey County, Kansas, United States. As of the 2000 census, its population was 1,268.

Geography
According to the USGS, it contains one cemetery, Lincoln.

The streams of Benedict Creek, Jordan Creek, Kennedy Creek, Lebo Creek, Logwater Branch and Troublesome Creek run through this township.

References
 USGS Geographic Names Information System (GNIS)

External links
 US-Counties.com
 City-Data.com

Townships in Coffey County, Kansas
Townships in Kansas